Roding Valley is a London Underground station situated in Buckhurst Hill in the Epping Forest district of Essex, straddling the boundary between that council and Greater London (the London Borough of Redbridge). The station is on the Hainault loop of the Central line between Chigwell and Woodford stations. However, geographically it is midway between Woodford and Buckhurst Hill stations. It is located between Station Way and Cherry Tree Rise (off Buckhurst Way). Since 2 January 2007, the station has been in Travelcard Zone 4.

Location

It was originally named Roding Valley Halt (though while the full name appeared on tickets and timetables, the suffix Halt appeared on only some of the station signage), and was opened to serve new housing developments between Buckhurst Hill and Woodford. It was named after the River Roding which is close by, to the east. The track rises towards Chigwell and crosses the Roding over an impressive viaduct. Woodford Junction, where the Hainault branch leaves the main Central line to Epping, is very close to the station – Roding Valley's platforms are visible from the train in either direction between Woodford and Buckhurst Hill (on the left of the train towards Woodford).

Roding Valley station has a very small catchment area, which explains its low usage. To the east is an undeveloped flood plain of the river Roding. A short distance to the north is Buckhurst Hill station. To the north-west is open space, while the areas to the south are served by Woodford station, which has a better train service. The station straddles the border between Redbridge and Epping Forest. The southern exit is in Redbridge, while the northern exit is in Epping Forest.

History
The tracks through Roding Valley were opened on 1 May 1903 by the Great Eastern Railway (GER) on its Woodford to Ilford line (the Fairlop Loop). The station was not opened until 3 February 1936 by the London and North Eastern Railway (LNER, successor to the GER).

As part of the 1935–1940 New Works Programme of the London Passenger Transport Board the majority of the Woodford to Ilford loop was to be transferred to form the eastern extensions of the Central line. Although work started in 1938 it was suspended at the outbreak of the Second World War in 1939 and work was only resumed in 1946. In connection with the alterations required for the electrification of the line, the station was closed from 29 November 1947. It reopened, with its present name, and was first served by the Central line from 21 November 1948. The rather basic station buildings (all-wooden on the Woodford-bound side) were replaced by more substantial structures by 1949.

From the mid-1960s until the early 1990s the Woodford-Hainault section was largely operated separately from the rest of the Central line, using four-car (later three-car) trains of 1960 Stock. The three car units had a 1938 tube stock middle carriage. These trains were adapted for Automatic Train Operation (ATO): the Woodford-Hainault section became the testing ground for ATO on the Victoria line. Some Victoria line (1967 Stock) trains were also used to operate this section and named FACT, "Fully Automatic Controlled Train". The separate operation has now been abolished, the 1960 Stock has been withdrawn and through trains to Central London now operate via Hainault. Because of this, it is normally quicker to travel to Woodford and change there, as trains to central London run frequently from that point. At the buildup to the peak periods, some trains starting from Hainault depot operate to central London via Grange Hill, Chigwell, Roding Valley and Woodford. This is done for operating convenience but passenger demand for these services is particularly high.

The station today
Roding Valley is the most lightly used station on the Underground. It is also one of the twelve tube stations not to have ticket barriers. The station underwent refurbishment in 2006 by Metronet.

Before this, the ticket office was only staffed for a few hours every week to allow the sale of period Travelcards and other season tickets. In the 1980s the station had a foreman, a ticket office clerk, and two railmen, one of whom sold tickets on the Woodford bound (inner rail) platform using a Gibson machine, the other collecting tickets on the Chigwell bound (outer rail) platform.

Services
The train service (which used to end at 8pm each day) has been extended to midnight to take into account the rising passenger numbers. The typical off-peak service in trains per hour (tph) is:
 3 tph to Hainault
 3 tph to Woodford

At morning rush hour, there are three trains that run to West Ruislip.

Connections
London Buses route 549 serves the station.

References

External links 
 London Transport Museum Photographic Archive
 
 

Central line (London Underground) stations
Tube stations in Essex
Transport in Epping Forest District
Transport in the London Borough of Redbridge
Former London and North Eastern Railway stations
Railway stations in Great Britain opened in 1936
1936 establishments in England